The environmental impacts of animal agriculture vary because of the wide variety of agricultural practices employed around the world. Despite this, all agricultural practices have been found to have a variety of effects on the environment. Animal agriculture, in particular meat production can cause pollution, greenhouse gas emissions, biodiversity loss, disease, and significant consumption of land, food, and water. Meat is obtained through a variety of methods, including organic farming, free range farming, intensive livestock production and subsistence agriculture. The livestock sector also includes wool, and egg and dairy production, the livestock used for tillage, and fish farming.

Animal agriculture is a significant contributor to greenhouse gas emissions from agriculture: Cows, sheep and other ruminants digest their food by enteric fermentation, and their burps are the main methane emissions from land use, land-use change, and forestry: together with methane and nitrous oxide from manure this makes livestock the main source of greenhouse gas emissions from agriculture. A significant reduction in meat consumption will be essential to mitigate climate change, especially as the human population increases by a projected 2.3 billion by the middle of the century.

Consumption and production trends

Multiple studies have found that increases in meat consumption are currently associated with human population growth and rising individual incomes or GDP and therefore, the environmental impacts of meat will increase unless behaviours change.

Changes in demand for meat may change the environmental impact of meat production by influencing how much meat is produced. It has been estimated that global meat consumption may double from 2000 to 2050, mostly as a consequence of increasing world population, but also partly because of increased per capita meat consumption (with much of the per capita consumption increase occurring in the developing world). The human population is projected to grow to 9 billion by 2050, and meat production is expected to increase by 40%. Global production and consumption of poultry meat have recently been growing at more than 5 percent annually. Meat consumption typically increases as people and countries get richer. According to an article written by Dave Roos "industrialised Western nations average more than 220 pounds of meat per person per year, while the poorest African nations average less than 22 pounds per person." Trends also vary among livestock sectors. For example, global consumption per capita of pork has increased recently (almost entirely due to changes in consumption within China), while global consumption per capita of ruminant meats has been declining.

The Neo-Malthusian concept proposes that there will be an increased demand for food supplies with population growth, which will lead to the inability to sustain a healthy population. The rate of human population growth is outpacing that of the food supply, which is growing at a slower pace. Mohan Roa suggests that if the world's population exceeds the threshold of the amount of food needed to sustain it, there is a risk of famine. Yet, reducing the birth rate among humans could prevent a significant impact on the global food supply. In 1952, India launched an official family planning program to reduce the population growth rate, which promoted the use of IUDs, vasectomies, and female sterilization.

Resource use

Food consumption 
Depending on the production system and the type of feed, it takes between 0.9 and 7.9kg of grain to produce 1kg of beef, between 0.1 to 4.3kg of grain to produce 1kg of pork and 0 to 3.5kg of gains to produce 1kg of chicken.

About 85 percent of the world's soybean crop is processed into meal and vegetable oil, and virtually all of that meal is used in animal feed. Approximately six percent of soybeans are used directly as human food, mostly in Asia. In the contiguous United States, 127.4 million acres of crops are grown for animal consumption, compared to the 77.3 million acres of crops grown for human consumption.

For every 100 lbs of food we make for humans from crops, 37 lbs of human inedible byproducts are created, and many countries feed their cows these crop byproducts. Raising animals for human consumption accounts for approximately 40% of the total amount of agricultural output in industrialised countries.

However, FAO estimates that about 2 thirds of the pasture area used by livestock is not convertible to crop-land.

Major corporations purchase land in different developing nations in Latin America and Asia to support large-scale production of animal feed crops, mainly corn and soybeans. This practice reduces the amount of land available for growing crops that are fit for human consumption in these countries, putting the local population at risk of food security.

According to a study conducted by Zhihoa Zheng in Jiangsu, China, individuals with higher incomes tend to consume more food than those with lower incomes and larger families. Consequently, it is unlikely those employed in animal feed production in these regions do not consume the animals that eat the crops they produce. The lack of space for growing crops for consumption, coupled with the need to feed larger families, only exacerbates their food insecurity.

Land use 
Permanent meadows and pastures, grazed or not, occupy 26% of the earth's ice-free terrestrial surface. Feed crop production uses about one third of all arable land. More than one-third of U.S. land is used for pasture, making it the largest land-use type in the contiguous United States.

In many countries, livestock graze from the land which mostly cannot be used for growing human-edible crops, as seen by the fact that there is three times as much agricultural land as arable land.

Free-range animal production, particularly beef production, has also caused tropical deforestation because it requires land for grazing. The livestock sector is also the primary driver of deforestation in the Amazon, with around 80% of all deforested land being used for cattle farming. Additionally, 91% of deforested land since 1970 has been used for cattle farming. Research has argued that a shift to meat-free diets could provide a safe option to feed a growing population without further deforestation, and for different yields scenarios. However, according to FAO, grazing livestock in drylands “removes vegetation, including dry and flammable plants, and mobilizes stored biomass through depositions, which is partly transferred to the soil, improving fertility. Livestock is key to creating and maintaining specific habitats and green infrastructures, providing resources for other species and dispersing seeds”.

Water use 

Almost one-third of the water used in the western United States goes to crops that feed cattle. This is despite the claim that withdrawn surface water and groundwater used for crop irrigation in the US exceeds that for livestock by about a ratio of 60:1.  This excessive use of river water distresses ecosystems and communities, and drives scores of species of fish closer to extinction during times of drought.

Irrigation accounts for about 37 percent of US withdrawn freshwater use, and groundwater provides about 42 percent of US irrigation water. Irrigation water applied in production of livestock feed and forage has been estimated to account for about 9 percent of withdrawn freshwater use in the United States. Groundwater depletion is a concern in some areas because of sustainability issues (and in some cases, land subsidence and/or saltwater intrusion). A particularly important North American example where depletion is occurring involves the High Plains (Ogallala) Aquifer, which underlies about 174,000 square miles in parts of eight states, and supplies 30 percent of the groundwater withdrawn for irrigation in the US. Some irrigated livestock feed production is not hydrologically sustainable in the long run because of aquifer depletion. Rainfed agriculture, which cannot deplete its water source, produces much of the livestock feed in North America. Corn (maize) is of particular interest, accounting for about 91.8 percent of the grain fed to US livestock and poultry in 2010. About 14 percent of US corn-for grain land is irrigated, accounting for about 17 percent of US corn-for-grain production, and about 13 percent of US irrigation water use, but only about 40 percent of US corn grain is fed to US livestock and poultry.

A 2019 study revolved around the linkages between water usage and animal agricultural practices in China. The results of the study showed that water resources were being primarily used for animal agriculture - the highest categories being animal husbandry, agriculture, slaughtering and processing of meat, fisheries, and other foods. All of them accounting for the consumption of 2408.10 billion m3 embodied water, roughly equating to 39.98% of total embodied water by the whole system. This means that more than one third of China's entire water consumption is being used for food processing purposes, and mostly for animal agricultural practices.

Water pollution 
Water pollution due to animal waste is a common problem in both developed and developing nations. The USA, Canada, India, Greece, Switzerland and several other countries are experiencing major environmental degradation due to water pollution via animal waste. Concerns about such problems are particularly acute in the case of CAFOs (concentrated animal feeding operations). In the US, a permit for a CAFO requires the implementation of a plan for the management of manure nutrients, contaminants, wastewater, etc., as applicable, to meet requirements under the Clean Water Act. There were about 19,000 CAFOs in the US as of 2008. In fiscal 2014, the United States Environmental Protection Agency (EPA) concluded 26 enforcement actions for various violations by CAFOs. Environmental performance of the US livestock industry can be compared with several other industries. The EPA has published 5-year and 1-year data for 32 industries on their ratios of enforcement orders to inspections, a measure of non-compliance with environmental regulations: principally, those under the Clean Water Act and Clean Air Act. For the livestock industry, inspections focused primarily on CAFOs. Of the 32 other industries, (including crop production) had a better 5-year environmental record than the livestock industry, 2 had a similar record, and 25 had a worse record in this respect. For the most recent year of the five-year compilation, livestock production and dry cleaning had the best environmental records of the 32 industries, each with an enforcement order/inspection ratio of 0.01. For crop production, the ratio was 0.02. Of the 32 industries, oil and gas extraction and the livestock industry had the lowest percentages of facilities with violations.Effective use of fertilizer is crucial to accelerate the growth of animal feed production, which in turn increases the amount of feed available for livestock. However, excess fertilizer can enter water bodies via runoff after rainfall, resulting in eutrophication. The addition of nitrogen and phosphorus can cause the rapid growth of algae, also known as an algae bloom. The reduction of oxygen and nutrients in the water due to the decrease caused by the growth of algae ultimately leads to the death of other species in the ecosystem. This ecological harm has consequences not only for the native animals in the affected water body but also for the water supply for people.

Air pollution 

Meat production is a leading cause of harmful particulate matter pollution in the atmosphere. This type of production chain produces copious byproducts; endotoxin, hydrogen sulfide, ammonia, and particulate matter (PM), such as dust, which can all negatively impact human respiratory health. Furthermore, methane and —the primary greenhouse gas emissions associated with meat production—have also been associated with respiratory diseases like asthma, bronchitis, and COPD.

Farmers are not the only ones at risk for exposure to these harmful byproducts. In fact, concentrated animal feeding operations (CAFOs) in proximity to residential areas adversely affect these individuals' respiratory health similarly seen in the farmers. Concentrated hog feeding operations release air pollutants from confinement buildings, manure holding pits, and land application of waste. Air pollutants from these operations have caused acute physical symptoms, such as respiratory illnesses, wheezing, increased breath rate, and irritation of the eyes and nose. That prolonged exposure to airborne animal particulate, such as swine dust, induces a large influx of inflammatory cells into the airways. Those in close proximity to CAFOs could be exposed to elevated levels of these byproducts, which may lead to poor health and respiratory outcomes.

Especially when modified by high temperatures, air pollution can harm all regions, socioeconomic groups, sexes, and age groups. Approximately seven million people die from air pollution exposure every year. Air pollution often exacerbates respiratory disease by permeating into the lung tissue and damaging the lungs.

Climate change aspects

Energy consumption 

An important aspect of energy use of livestock production is the energy consumption that the animals contribute. Feed Conversion Ratio is an animal's ability to convert feed into meat. The Feed Conversion Ratio (FCR) is calculated by taking the energy, protein, or mass input of the feed divided by the output of meat provided by the animal. A lower FCR corresponds with a smaller requirement of feed per meat out-put, therefore the animal contributes less GHG emissions. Chickens and pigs usually have a lower FCR compared to ruminants.

Intensification and other changes in the livestock industries influence energy use, emissions, and other environmental effects of meat production.

Manure can also have environmental benefits as a renewable energy source, in digester systems yielding biogas for heating and/or electricity generation. Manure biogas operations can be found in Asia, Europe, North America, and elsewhere. System cost is substantial, relative to US energy values, which may be a deterrent to more widespread use. Additional factors, such as odour control and carbon credits, may improve benefit to cost ratios. Manure can be mixed with other organic wastes in anaerobic digesters to take advantage of economies of scale. Digested waste is more uniform in consistency than untreated organic wastes, and can have higher proportions of nutrients that are more available to plants, which enhances the utility of digestate as a fertiliser product. This encourages circularity in meat production, which is typically difficult to achieve due to environmental and food safety concerns.

Greenhouse gas emissions 

Cows, sheep and other ruminants digest their food by enteric fermentation, and their burps are the main methane emissions from land use, land-use change, and forestry: together with methane and nitrous oxide from manure this makes livestock the main source of greenhouse gas emissions from agriculture.

The IPCC Sixth Assessment Report in 2022 stated that: "Diets high in plant protein and low in meat and dairy are associated with lower GHG emissions. [...] Where appropriate, a shift to diets with a higher share of plant protein, moderate intake of animal-source foods and reduced intake of saturated fats could lead to substantial decreases in GHG emissions. Benefits would also include reduced land occupation and nutrient losses to the surrounding environment, while at the same time providing health benefits and reducing mortality from diet-related non-communicable diseases."

According to a 2022 study quickly stopping animal agriculture would provide half the GHG emission reduction needed to meet the Paris Agreement goal of limiting global warming to 2 °C.

The global food system is responsible for one-third of the global anthropogenic GHG emissions, of which meat accounts for nearly 60%.

Mitigation options

Mitigation options for reducing methane emission from livestock are a change in diet, that is consuming less meat and dairy. A significant reduction in meat consumption will be essential to mitigate climate change, especially as the human population increases by a projected 2.3 billion by the middle of the century. A 2019 report in The Lancet recommended that global meat consumption be reduced by 50 percent to mitigate climate change.

Producers can reduce ruminant enteric fermentation using genetic selection, immunization, rumen defaunation, outcompetition of methanogenic archaea with acetogens, introduction of methanotrophic bacteria into the rumen, diet modification and grazing management, among others. The principal mitigation strategies identified for reduction of agricultural nitrous oxide emission are avoiding over-application of nitrogen fertilizers and adopting suitable manure management practices. Mitigation strategies for reducing carbon dioxide emissions in the livestock sector include adopting more efficient production practices to reduce agricultural pressure for deforestation (such as in Latin America), reducing fossil fuel consumption, and increasing carbon sequestration in soils.

A study quantified climate change mitigation potentials of 'high-income' nations shifting diets – away from meat-consumption – and restoration of the spared land, finding that if these were combined they could "reduce annual agricultural production emissions of high-income nations' diets by 61%".

Measures which increase state revenues from meat consumption/production could enable the use of these funds for related research and development and "to cushion social hardships among low-income consumers". Meat and livestock are important sectors of the contemporary socioeconomic system, with livestock value chains employing an estimated >1.3 billion people.

Effects on ecosystems

Soils 

Overgrazing sometimes decreases the soil quality by constantly depleting it of necessary nutrients. By the end of 2002, the US Bureau of Land Management (BLM) found that 16% of the evaluated 7,437 grazing allotments had failed to meet rangeland health standards because of their excessive grazing use. Overgrazing seems to cause soil erosion in many dry regions of the world. However, on US farmland, much less soil erosion occurs on land used for livestock grazing than with land used for crop production. According to the US Natural Resources Conservation Service, on 95.1% of US pastureland, sheet and rill erosion is within the estimated soil loss tolerance, and on 99.4% of US pastureland, wind erosion is within the estimated soil loss tolerance.

Grazing can have positive or negative effects on rangeland health, depending on management quality, and grazing can have different effects on different soils and different plant communities. Grazing can sometimes reduce, and other times increase, biodiversity of grassland ecosystems. In beef production, cattle ranching helps preserve and improve the natural environment by maintaining habitats that are well-suited for grazing animals. Lightly grazed grasslands also tend to have higher biodiversity than overgrazed or nongrazed grasslands.

Grazing can affect the sequestration of carbon and nitrogen in the soil. This sequestration which helps mitigate the effects of greenhouse gas emissions, and in some cases, increases ecosystem productivity by affecting nutrient cycling. A study found that grazing in US virgin grasslands causes the soil to have lower soil organic carbon but higher soil nitrogen content. In contrast, at the High Plains Grasslands Research Station in Wyoming, the soil in the grazed pastures had more organic carbon and nitrogen in the top 30 cm than the soil in nongrazed pastures. Additionally, in the Piedmont region of the US, well-managed grazing of livestock on previously eroded soil resulted in high rates of beneficial carbon and nitrogen sequestration compared to non-grazed grass.

Manure provides environmental benefits when properly managed. Manure that is deposited on pastures by grazing animals is an effective way to preserve soil fertility. Many nutrients are recycled in crop cultivation by collecting animal manure from barns and concentrated feeding sites, sometimes after composting. For many areas with high livestock density, manure application substantially replaces the application of synthetic fertilizers on surrounding cropland. Manure is also spread on forage-producing land that is grazed, rather than cropped.

Biodiversity 

Meat production is considered one of the prime factors contributing to the current biodiversity loss crisis. The 2019 IPBES Global Assessment Report on Biodiversity and Ecosystem Services found that industrial agriculture and overfishing are the primary drivers of the extinction, with the meat and dairy industries having a substantial impact. The global livestock sector contributes a significant share to anthropogenic GHG emissions, but it can also deliver a significant share of the necessary mitigation effort. FAO estimates that the adoption of already available best practices can reduce emissions by up to 30%. 

Grazing (especially overgrazing) may detrimentally affect certain wildlife species, e.g. by altering cover and food supplies. The growing demand for meat is contributing to significant biodiversity loss as it is a significant driver of deforestation and habitat destruction; species-rich habitats, such as significant portions of the Amazon region, are being converted to agriculture for meat production.  World Resource Institute (WRI) website mentions that "30 percent of global forest cover has been cleared, while another 20 percent has been degraded. Most of the rest has been fragmented, leaving only about 15 percent intact." WRI also states that around the world there is "an estimated 1.5 billion hectares (3.7 billion acres) of once-productive croplands and pasturelands – an area nearly the size of Russia – are degraded. Restoring productivity can improve food supplies, water security, and the ability to fight climate change." Around 25% to nearly 40% of global land surface is being used for livestock farming.

In North America, various studies have found that grazing sometimes improves habitat for elk,
blacktailed prairie dogs,
sage grouse,
and mule deer. A survey of refuge managers on 123 National Wildlife Refuges in the US tallied 86 species of wildlife considered positively affected and 82 considered negatively affected by refuge cattle grazing or haying. The kind of grazing system employed (e.g. rest-rotation, deferred grazing, HILF grazing) is often important in achieving grazing benefits for particular wildlife species.

A 2022 report from World Animal Protection and the Center for Biological Diversity found that, based on 2018 data, some 235 million pounds (or 117,500 tons) of pesticides are used for animal feed purposes annually in the United States alone, in particular glyphosate and atrazine. The report emphasizes that 100,000 pounds of glyphosate has the potential to harm or kill some 93% of species listed under the Endangered Species Act. Atrazine, which is banned in 35 countries, could harm or kill at least 1,000 listed species. Both groups involved in the report advocate for consumers to reduce their consumption of animal products and to transition towards plant-based diets in order to reduce the growth of factory farming and protect endangered species of wildlife.

The biologists Rodolfo Dirzo, Gerardo Ceballos, and Paul R. Ehrlich write in an opinion piece for Philosophical Transactions of the Royal Society B that reductions in meat consumption "can translate not only into less heat, but also more space for biodiversity." They insist that it is the "massive planetary monopoly of industrial meat production that needs to be curbed" while respecting the cultural traditions of indigenous peoples, for whom meat is an important source of protein.

Aquatic ecosystems 

In the Western United States, many stream and riparian habitats have been negatively affected by livestock grazing. This has resulted in increased phosphates, nitrates, decreased dissolved oxygen, increased temperature, turbidity, and eutrophication events, and reduced species diversity. Livestock management options for riparian protection include salt and mineral placement, limiting seasonal access, use of alternative water sources, provision of "hardened" stream crossings, herding, and fencing. In the Eastern United States, a 1997 study found that waste release from pork farms have also been shown to cause large-scale eutrophication of bodies of water, including the Mississippi River and Atlantic Ocean (Palmquist, et al., 1997). In North Carolina, where the study was done, measures have since been taken to reduce the risk of accidental discharges from manure lagoons; also, since then there is evidence of improved environmental management in US hog production. Implementation of manure and wastewater management planning can help assure low risk of problematic discharge into aquatic systems.

In Central-Eastern Argentina, a 2017 study found large quantities of metal pollutants (chromium, copper, arsenic and lead) in their freshwater streams, disrupting the aquatic biota. The level of Cr in the freshwater systems exceeded 181.5x the recommended guidelines necessary for survival of aquatic life, while Pb was 41.6x, Cu was 57.5x, and As exceeded 12.9x. The results showed excess metal accumulation due to agricultural runoff, the use of pesticides, and poor mitigation efforts to stop the excess runoff.

Effects on antibiotic resistance
There are concerns about meat production's potential to spread diseases as an environmental impact.

Alternatives to meat production and consumption 

Novel foods such as under-development cultured meat and dairy, algae, existing microbial foods and ground-up insects are shown to have the potential to reduce environmental impacts – by over 80% in a study. Various combinations may further reduce the environmental impacts of these alternatives – for example a study explored solar-energy-driven production of microbial foods from direct air capture. Alternatives are not only relevant for human consumption but also for pet food and other animal feed.

Meat reduction and health
Meat can be substituted in diets with a wide variety of foods such as fungi or special "meat substitutes".

However, substantially reducing meat intake could result in nutritional deficiencies if done inadequately, especially for groups such as children, adolescents, and pregnant and lactating women "in low-income countries". A review suggests that the reduction of meat in people's diets should be accompanied by an increase in alternative sources of protein and micronutrients to avoid nutritional deficiencies for healthy diets such as iron and zinc. Meats notably also contain vitamin B12, collagen and creatine. This could be achieved with specific types of foods such as iron-rich beans and a diverse vatiety of protein-rich foods like red lentils, plant-based protein powders and high-protein wraps, and/or dietary supplements. Dairy and fish and/or specific types of other foods and/or supplements contain omega 3, vitamin K2, vitamin D3, iodine, magnesium and calcium many of which were generally lower in people consuming types of plant-based diets in studies.

Nevertheless, reviews find beneficial effects of plant-based diets versus conventional diets on health and lifespan or mortality.

Meat-reduction strategies
(Large-scale) education and awareness building are important strategies to promote more sustainable consumption styles. In 2022 the city of Haarlem, Netherlands announced that advertisements for factory-farmed meat will be banned in public places, starting in 2024.

Other types of policy interventions could accelerate the shifts and could include "restrictions or fiscal mechanisms such as [meat] taxes". In the case of fiscal mechanisms, such could be based on forms of scientific calculation of external costs (externalities currently not reflected in any way in the monetary price) to make the polluter pay, for example for the damage done by excess nitrogen. In the case of restrictions, such could be based on limited domestic supply or Personal (Carbon) Allowances (certificates and credits which would reward sustainable behavior).

Relevant to such a strategy, estimating the environmental impacts of food products in a standardized way – as has been done with a dataset of more than 57,000 food products in supermarkets – could also be used to inform consumers or in policy and would make consumers more aware of the environmental impacts of animal-based products (or require them to take such into consideration).

A review concluded that "low and moderate meat consumption levels are compatible with the climate targets and broader sustainable development, even for 10 billion people".

The Netherlands is reducing the amount of livestock by buying out some farmers.

A reduction in meat portion sizes could potentially be more beneficial than cutting out meat entirely from ones diet, according to a 2022 study. The study revolved around young Dutch adults, and showed that the adults were more reluctant to cut out meat entirely to make the change to plant-based diets due to habitual behaviours. Increasing, as well as improving, plant-based alternatives, as well as the education behind plant-based alternatives proved to be one of the most effective ways to combat these behaviours. The lack of education behind plant-based alternatives is a road-block for most people - most adults do not know how to properly cook plant-based meals, or know the health risks/benefits associated with a vegetarian diet - which is why education among adults is important in meat-reduction strategies.

Young adults that were faced with new physical or social environments were more likely to make dietary changes, and reduce their meat intake (for example, moving away from home). Increasing the prices of meat, while also reducing the prices of plant-based products could show a significant impact on meat-reduction. In the Netherlands, a meat tax of 15% to 30% could show a reduction of meat consumption by 8% - 16%.

Beneficial environmental effects
According to FAO, crop-residues and by-products account for 24% of the total dry matter intake of the global livestock sector. A 2018 study found that, "Currently, 70 % of the feedstock used in the Dutch feed industry originates from the food processing industry." Examples of grain-based waste conversion in the United States include feeding livestock the distillers grains (with solubles) remaining from ethanol production. For the marketing year 2009–2010, dried distillers grains used as livestock feed (and residual) in the US was estimated at 25.5 million metric tons. Examples of waste roughages include straw from barley and wheat crops (edible especially to large-ruminant breeding stock when on maintenance diets), and corn stover. Also, small-ruminant flocks in North America (and elsewhere) are sometimes used on fields for removal of various crop residues inedible by humans, converting them to food.

Small ruminants, such as sheep and goats, can control some invasive or noxious weeds (such as spotted knapweed, tansy ragwort, leafy spurge, yellow starthistle, tall larkspur, etc.) on rangeland. Small ruminants are also useful for vegetation management in forest plantations and for clearing brush on rights-of-way. Other ruminants, like Nublang cattle, are used in Bhutan to help of a species of bamboo, Yushania microphylla, which tends to crowd out indigenous species of plants. These represent alternatives to herbicide use.

Examples

Pigs

See also 

Agroecology
Animal-free agriculture
Animal–industrial complex
Carbon tax
Meat price
Cultured meat
Economic vegetarianism
Factory farming divestment
Environmental impact of agriculture
Environmental impact of fishing
Environmental vegetarianism
Food vs. feed
Stranded assets in the agriculture and forestry sector
Sustainable agriculture
Sustainable diet
Veganism

References

Meat
Environmental impact of agriculture
Meat
Climate change and agriculture